An interim championship is an alternate title that is awarded by the sanctioning bodies of professional boxing, and in other combat sports such as kickboxing, professional wrestling, and mixed martial arts.

Occasionally, the champion of a particular weight division is temporarily unable to defend his championship because of medical, legal, or other reasons beyond the competitor's control. When this case occurs, two highly ranked contenders may fight for an interim championship of the same weight division – leading to two champions existing in the same weight division simultaneously. Once the original champion can return, at the discretion of the sanctioning body or promotion concerned, they must defend their title against the interim champion - who will relinquish their interim title to fight for the full world title. If the original champion cannot return, refuses to defend their title, or transfers to a different weight division, the interim champion is promoted to full championship status. The WBC, however, has begun awarding interim titles to the winners of final eliminator fights, effectively signifying a mandatory challenger position for the full world title. Recent examples include the winners of Dillian Whyte vs. Oscar Rivas and Devin Haney vs. Zaur Abdullaev.

In the case of professional wrestling, due to the entertainment and scripted nature of the sport, an interim championship is rarely used as most reasons – while similar to the ones in combat sports that are sometimes beyond the wrestler's control – usually lead to the champion being stripped of the title and a new champion is determined. One example of an interim champion was on WWE's NXT brand, where NXT Cruiserweight Champion Jordan Devlin could not travel to the United States to defend the title due to COVID-19 travel restrictions, rendering him only able to defend the title on NXT's UK brand at the time. Therefore, in the United States, an interim Cruiserweight Championship was created and won in a tournament by Santos Escobar. Once travel restrictions eased up, Devlin and Escobar fought in a unification match at NXT TakeOver: Stand & Deliver to determine the sole champion, which Escobar won. Recent examples include the winners of Jon Moxley vs. Hiroshi Tanahashi and Toni Storm vs. Britt Baker vs. Jamie Hayter vs. Hikaru Shida.

Current interim champions

See also
List of current world boxing champions
List of current female world boxing champions
 List of current mixed martial arts champions

References 

 Jackson, Ron. "Flyweight champ wins 15th defence." SuperBoxing. URL accessed 3 August 2006.
 WBA officials. World Boxing Association World Championships Regulations. World Boxing Association. accessed 22 December 2014.

Boxing rules and regulations
Boxing champions